The National Union of Agricultural and Allied Workers (NUAW) was a trade union in the United Kingdom which existed between 1906 and 1982. It represented farmworkers.

History 
The union was established as the Eastern Counties Agricultural Labourers & Small Holders Union at a conference of Norfolk agricultural workers at the Angel Hotel, North Walsham on 20 July 1906. Its first president was George Nicholls, its secretary (on 13 shillings a week) was George Edwards and its treasurer was Richard Winfrey.  The other members of its executive committee were J. Binder, J. Sage, William G. Codling, Herbert Day, J. Bly, C. Holman and J. Stibbins.

The first three branches of the union were in Norfolk at St Faith's (former stronghold of Joseph Arch's old National Agricultural Labourers Union) and Kenninghall and Shipham.

In 1910 major strikes and disputes broke out in the Norfolk villages of Trunch, Knapton and St Faith's. At St Faith's, the 105 union men were on strike from May 1910 until February 1911 for 1 shilling a week extra.

The organisation changed its name in 1910 to the National Agricultural Labourers and Rural Workers Union. Edwards stood down as Secretary in 1913, but then took up the post of President. In 1920, the union became the National Union of Agricultural Workers, and in 1968 the "National Union of Agricultural and Allied Workers".

The union not only fought for worker's rights but also provide social activities.

The union's stronghold was in Norfolk, Lincolnshire and Dorset with over 90% of agricultural labourers being in membership.

William "Bill" Holmes, NUAW General Secretary once told an audience of American trade unionists:
"In many of our villages, a man who joins a trade union is worthy of the Victoria Cross that's won on a battlefield. In many villages he dare not be known to be a member of the union. But to be a branch secretary! That is to risk one's livelihood every day in the week".

The union's journal was The Landworker.

The union became the Agricultural Section of the Transport and General Workers' Union in 1982.  The Dorset County Committee organises the annual Tolpuddle Martyrs festival along with the TUC.

Election results
The union worked closely with the Labour Party from its early years. Until 1945, it contributed election expenses to some candidates, but no ongoing expenses to those who won election, and therefore it is often not listed as a sponsor in this period.

Leadership

General Secretaries
1906: George Edwards
1913: Robert Barrie Walker
1928: Bill Holmes
1944: Alf Dann
1953: Harold Collison
1969: Reg Bottini
1978: Jack Boddy

Presidents
1906: George Nicholls
1911: Walter Robert Smith
1924: Bill Holmes
1928: Edwin Gooch
1966: Bert Hazell
1978: John Hose

See also

 List of trade unions
 List of Transport and General Workers' Union amalgamations
 Transport and General Workers' Union

References

External links
Catalogue of the NUAW archives held at the Modern Records Centre, University of Warwick
Country Standard
Account of the founding of the union From EASF website

 
Defunct trade unions of the United Kingdom
Agriculture and forestry trade unions
1906 establishments in the United Kingdom
Transport and General Workers' Union amalgamations
Trade unions established in 1906
Trade unions disestablished in 1982
Agricultural organisations based in the United Kingdom
1982 disestablishments in the United Kingdom
Trade unions based in London